El Vilar de Cabó is a locality located in the municipality of Cabó, in Province of Lleida province, Catalonia, Spain. As of 2020, it has a population of 21.

Geography 
El Vilar de Cabó is located 122km northeast of Lleida.

References

Populated places in the Province of Lleida